Atlanta is an unincorporated community in Columbia County, Arkansas, United States, at an elevation of . Highway 98 passes south through Atlanta before turning west to Emerson.

References

Unincorporated communities in Arkansas
Unincorporated communities in Columbia County, Arkansas